Robert Miller (1866–1931) was a Church of Ireland bishop in the first half of the 20th century.

Miller was educated at Trinity College, Dublin and ordained for Christ Church Derry in 1892.  He was Rector of Donegal from 1894 to 1900. After a further incumbency at Raphoe he was Secretary of the Incorporated Society for Promoting Protestant Schools in Ireland until 1916.

 
He was Dean of Waterford from then until 1919, when he became Bishop of Cashel, Emly, Waterford and Lismore-   a post he held until his death on 13 March 1931.

He accompanied the Church of Ireland Archbishop of Dublin John Gregg and Protestant businessman Sir William Goulding "to see Michael Collins in May 1922, following the murders of thirteen Protestants in the Bandon valley, to ask whether the Protestant minority should stay on. Collins 'assured them that the government would maintain civil and religious liberty'."

References

  

1866 births
Alumni of Trinity College Dublin
Deans of Waterford
20th-century Anglican bishops in Ireland
Bishops of Cashel and Waterford
1931 deaths